Meikle Millyea is a hill in the Rhinns of Kells, a sub-range of the Galloway Hills range, part of the Southern Uplands of Scotland. The true summit of the hill has been disputed over the years; a 2015 survey concluded that the southwest top, around 400m southwest from the trig point and cairn is approximately 2m higher.

References

Mountains and hills of the Southern Uplands
Mountains and hills of Dumfries and Galloway
Donald mountains